Castilleja minor is a species of flowering plant in the family Orobanchaceae known by the common name lesser Indian paintbrush.

It is native to western North America from British Columbia to California to New Mexico, where it grows in moist habitats such as spring meadows.

Description
This is an annual herb growing a mostly unbranching slender stem to heights from 30 centimeters to well over a meter. The leaves are lance-shaped and several centimeters long. The top of the stem is occupied by an inflorescence of green bracts tipped with bright red and smaller, yellowish flowers. The fruit is a capsule just over a centimeter long.

External links
Calflora: Castilleja minor
Jepson Manual Treatment (TJM2)
FNA treatment

minor
Flora of the Northwestern United States
Flora of the Southwestern United States
Flora of British Columbia
Flora of California
Flora of New Mexico
Flora without expected TNC conservation status